Caitlyn Folley, also known as Caker Folley, is an American actress known for her role as Stacy in The FP (2011).

Career 
Following small roles in Speak, Happy Endings, Beautiful Loser, and Archie's Final Project, Folley was cast as the primary love interest in The FP, replacing Diana Gaeta. The film premiered at South by Southwest on March 13, 2011. In 2013, she played the lead role of Jill in Bernard Rose's Sx Tape. It premiered at the BFI London Film Festival.

Filmography

Film

Television

Notes

References

External links 

Living people
Year of birth missing (living people)
American film actresses
21st-century American women